Anomala inclinata is a species of beetle in the family Scarabaeidae. It was described by Ming-Zhi Zhao and Carsten Zorn in 2022.

Etymology 
The species is named after the Latin adjective “inclinatus, -a, -um”, alluding to the inclined parameres of this species.

Distribution 
This species can be found in Taiwan.

References 

Rutelinae
Beetles described in 2022
Insects of Taiwan